Oleg Anatolyevich Platonov (born 11 January 1950) is a Russian ultranationalist writer and Holocaust denier. He is the Director General of the Institute for the History of Russian Civilization, a Moscow-based think tank. He is known for promoting the antisemitic conspiracy theory Judeo-Bolshevism, which claims that Jews were responsible for the Russian Revolution.

Biography
Platonov was born in Yekaterinburg, Russia, then known as Sverdlovsk. In 1972 he graduated from Moscow College of Consumer Cooperation. He worked in the international department of TsSU and, since 1977, in the Institute for Labor. In 1995 he organized a research institution Russian Civilization. He lived for seven months in the United States then returned to Russia. He published the encyclopedic dictionary Holy Rus and four volumes of The Great Encyclopedia of Russian People (out of a proposed twenty volumes), in which he praises the civilization of "Holy Rus'″ which, however, he claims has been undermined since the 17th century by various foreign elements ("чужебесия″) - forerunners of "Jewish-Masonic plotters" which he claims organized the Bolshevik Revolution.

Although Platonov holds the Bolshevik regime responsible for 87 million lives, he argues Joseph Stalin made "the first step toward the salvation of Russia from Jewish Bolshevism.″

Since 2003, Platonov's encyclopedia publishing center was transformed into the independent think tank 'Institute for the History of Russian Civilization' (short name 'Russian Institute'), whose goal is stated as research and dissemination of the ideas of Metropolitan Ioann of St Petersburg and Ladoga (né Ivan Snychev; 1927–1995) with Platonov as the Institute's Director General.

In his work The History of the Russian People in the Twentieth Century, Platonov treats the February and October revolutions of 1917 as handiwork of Judæo-Masonic conspirators, the agents of the Entente and of the German Empire. Similarly, he regards the leaders of Ukrainian and Baltic independence movements as spies and German agents.

Holocaust denial
An article in the Journal of Historical Review of a special issue of Russky Vestnik promoting Holocaust denial describes Platonov's preface:
...Russian historian Dr. Oleg A. Platonov writes of the "myth of the 'Holocaust', namely, that six million Jews were allegedly put to death in gas chambers during the Second World War." This myth, he continues, "has taken hold in the mass mind with particular force," with the aim of encouraging non-Jews to "feel a sense of guilt, repent[,] and pay restitution."
Platonov further claimed that "[t]he myth of the Holocaust insults humanity".

Reception
The Russian human rights activist Alexander Brod, writer and historian Semyon Reznik, and the Federation of Jewish Communities of Russia regard Platonov's works as antisemitic. Reznik also notes that Platonov is one of the main promoters of the blood libel.

Works
Russia's Crown of Thorns: The Secret History of Freemasonry 1731-1996 (Moscow, 1996)
Еврейский вопрос в России (The Jewish Question in Russia; Moscow: Presskom, 2005); 
Why America is dying (Почему Погибнет Америка; Moscow, 2008);

See also
Historical revisionism
Holocaust denial

References

External links
Online versions of Platonov books  on Aldebaran.ru 
Online versions of Platonov books on Lib.ru 
Reviews of books by Platonov 

1950 births
Antisemitism in Russia
Blood libel
Living people
Writers from Yekaterinburg
20th-century Russian historians
Russian Holocaust deniers
Russian nationalists
21st-century Russian historians